was one of the last native speakers of the Ainu language and a leading figure in the Ainu ethnic movement in Japan.

Early life 
Kayano was born in Nibutani village in Biratori, Hokkaidō, Japan.  His family name at birth was Kaizawa, but he was adopted out by name to his aunt's family. He was raised in poverty by his alcoholic father and devout Buddhist mother, and gained his first appreciation of Ainu culture from his grandmother, Tekatte, who would share traditional stories in Ainu with him.

Cultural leader 
Though he did not reach a high level of formal education, he undertook an impassioned study of Ainu folklore, art, language and history. His activism helped bring about the founding of the Nibutani Ainu Culture Museum in 1972. He was an acknowledged living master of the Ainu oral tradition, an expert in its folk arts and language. He led the effort to found 15 Ainu language schools.

Political leader 
He was the first Ainu politician to sit in the Diet of Japan. He served five terms in the assembly before taking over a vacated seat in the upper house for the SDP. There he served from 1994 to 1998.  In the Diet, he often posed questions in the Ainu language. His effort led to the enactment of a law to promote Ainu culture in 1997.

Shigeru Kayano was also known for leading the protest movement against the Nibutani Dam. The dam over the Saru River, completed in 1997 despite legal attempts to stop it, flooded land sacred to the Ainu. Though unsuccessful, the legal effort did result in a ruling by the Sapporo District Court, acknowledging the Ainu as the indigenous people of Hokkaidō for the first time.  He also succeeded in his quest for abolition of The Protective Act for the Ainus in Hokkaido and enacting the Act for the Promotion of Ainu Culture & Dissemination of Knowledge Regarding Ainu Traditions in 1997.

He died of pneumonia at a hospital in Sapporo, Hokkaidō on May 6, 2006, just over a month short of his 80th birthday.

Works 
Shigeru Kayano has written about 100 books about the Ainu language and culture, including 28 yukar collections. Some of his works were translated into English:
 The Ainu and the Fox – 2006
 The Ainu: A Story of Japan's Original People – 2004
 Our Land was a Forest: an Ainu Memoir – 1994
 Yukar, the Ainu Epic and Folktales – 1988
 The Romance of the Bear God – 1985

References

Obituary in Asahi Shinbun-International Herald Tribune May 5, 2006
Act for the Promotion of Ainu Culture & Dissemination of Knowledge Regarding Ainu Traditions (Hitchingham trans.)
Kayano et al. v. Hokkaido Expropriation Committee: 'The Nibutani Dam Decision' (Levin trans.) (1999). International Legal Materials, Vol. 38, p. 394, 1999.

1926 births
2006 deaths
Japanese Ainu people
Ainu politics
Writers from Hokkaido
Deaths from pneumonia in Japan
Members of the House of Representatives (Japan)
Members of the House of Councillors (Japan)
Social Democratic Party (Japan) politicians
Politicians from Hokkaido